George Pike England (ca.1765 – February 1815) was an English organ builder who was among the most prominent in England during the late 18th and early 19th centuries.

Life

He was the son of organ builder George England and Mary Blasdale.  He married Ann Wilson on 13 October 1789 in St Pancras parish church. He was buried at St Andrew's, Holborn, after his death in February 1815.

Career

He left a list of the organs he built in an extant account book. They are those of: 
St. George's Chapel; Portsmouth Common, 1788
St James's Church, Clerkenwell, and Fetter Lane Chapel, 1790
Adelphi Chapel, 1791
Gainsborough Church, Lincolnshire, 1793
Newington Church, Surrey, and Blandford Forum Church, 1794
St Peter's, Carmarthen, 1796
St Margaret Lothbury, 1801
Sardinian Embassy Chapel, Lincoln's Inn, London, 1802 (demolished)
Church of St. Mary Magdalene, Newark-on-Trent, Nottinghamshire, 1803
Sheffield Parish Church, St. Philip's, Birmingham, and St Martin Outwich, 1805
Hinckley Parish Church, 1808
St Thomas' Church, Stourbridge; Richmond, Yorkshire; Lancaster Priory, 1809
Shiffnall, Salop, and Ulverston, 1811
St Mary's Church, Islington, 1812
The 1809 organ at St Mary the Virgin, Bishops Cannings, Wiltshire is also attributed to him.

England built an organ for Salisbury Cathedral which proved to be insufficiently powerful, and in 1792 was reinstalled in St Denys' Church, Warminster, Wiltshire. Its organ case is described by Pevsner as "a delightful piece".

For a short while before his death, Joseph William Walker (1802–1870) was apprenticed to him. Walker later founded the company of J. W. Walker & Sons Ltd.

References

1760s births
1815 deaths
Pipe organ building companies
Organ builders of the United Kingdom